Joseph P. Crotty (December 24, 1860 in Cincinnati – June 22, 1926 in Minneapolis, Minnesota) was a 19th-century professional baseball catcher.  Crotty played from 1882–1886 in the American Association for the Louisville Eclipse, St. Louis Brown Stockings, and New York Metropolitans and for the Cincinnati Outlaw Reds in the Union Association.

External links

1860 births
1926 deaths
Baseball players from Cincinnati
Major League Baseball catchers
Louisville Eclipse players
Louisville Colonels players
St. Louis Brown Stockings (AA) players
Cincinnati Outlaw Reds players
New York Metropolitans players
19th-century baseball players
Fort Wayne Hoosiers players
Bay City (minor league baseball) players
Syracuse Stars (minor league baseball) players
Memphis Browns players
Jackson Jaxons players
Memphis Grays players
Sioux City Corn Huskers players
Helena (minor league baseball) players
East Liverpool East End All Stars players
Canton Deubers players